The 1999 German Open was a tennis tournament played on outdoor clay courts. It was the 92nd edition of the Hamburg Masters (German Open), and was part of the ATP Super 9 of the 1999 ATP Tour. It took place at the Rothenbaum Tennis Center in Hamburg, Germany, from through 3 May through 10 May 1999.

Seeds
Champion seeds are indicated in bold text while text in italics indicates the round in which those seeds were eliminated.

Draw

Finals

Top half

Bottom half

References

Doubles
1999 ATP German Open
ATP German Open